is a private university at Seki, Gifu, Japan. The predecessor of the school was founded in 1918.

External links
 Official website 

Educational institutions established in 1918
Private universities and colleges in Japan
Universities and colleges in Gifu Prefecture
Seki, Gifu
1918 establishments in Japan
Christian universities and colleges in Japan